Mickey's Amateurs is a 1937 American animated short film produced by Walt Disney Productions and released by United Artists. Originally entitled Mickey's Amateur Concert during production, the cartoon depicts an amateur talent show hosted by Mickey Mouse. It was the 94th short film in the Mickey Mouse film series, and the fifth for that year. It was co-directed by Pinto Colvig, Erdman Penner, and Walt Pfeiffer, and features original and adapted music by Oliver Wallace. The voice cast includes Walt Disney as Mickey, Clarence Nash as Donald Duck, Florence Gill as Clara Cluck, and Pinto Colvig as Pete and Goofy.

Plot
Mickey Mouse is hosting an amateur talent show in front of a live audience for radio, in which he terminates unworthy performances by ringing a gong. In the first scene, Mickey's gong ends Pete's rendition of "Asleep in the Deep".

Next, Mickey introduces Donald Duck, who first presents an apple to Mickey in an attempt to win him over preemptively. But Donald's recitation of "Twinkle, Twinkle, Little Star" ends badly as he forgets the words. Mickey rings the gong, and Donald is removed from the stage. As Mickey is announcing the next act, a disgruntled Donald returns to take back the apple.

The next act, as introduced by Mickey, are "the two Claras: Cluck and Belle." Clara Cluck sings a clucking version of "Il Bacio", a waltz by Luigi Arditi, accompanied by Clarabelle Cow on piano. Despite several blunders, the performance is the first to avoid the gong.

Next, Donald returns to the stage wearing a disguise and carrying a violin case. Upon reaching the center stage, Donald throws off the disguise and pulls a submachine gun from the case. He holds Mickey and the audience at gunpoint, determined to finish his recitation—but again, he forgets the words. When the audience laughs at him, he opens fire and is once again removed from the stage.

For the show's final act, Mickey introduces Goofy and his "50-piece band," which turns out to be a multi-instrumental device on wheels. Goofy begins with "In the Good Old Summer Time" and moves on to "There'll Be a Hot Time in the Old Town Tonight", but the tempo and intensity of the song destroy the machine. Goofy appears out of the wreckage and sheepishly says, "It busted!" Donald ends the show by performing a rapid-fire word-perfect recitation of "Twinkle, Twinkle, Little Star", satisfying his victory. However, the "iris out" effect which ends the cartoon closes on his neck. He struggles to keep it open, but it finally closes.

History
Mickey's Amateurs pokes fun at "amateur hour" radio shows, popular entertainment in the 1930s and '40s. Perhaps the most famous example is the Major Bowes Amateur Hour in which the host, Edward Bowes, was known to strike a gong to stop an amateur performance. Mickey Mouse's repeating of the words "Okay, okay" in the film was recognized by audiences at the time as a parody of Bowes.

The film was also inspired by the 1934 Disney film Orphan's Benefit. This film also featured a stage show with acts interspersed by Donald attempting a poetic recitation.

The short movie inspired the model of the game show The Gong Show, hosted in the '70s by Chuck Barris, who used the same method of show-host Mickey use in the short.

Reception
The Motion Picture Herald published a review of Mickey's Amateurs on June 19, 1937, saying, "The subject must be seen to be appreciated and enjoyed. The fun it offers defies description."

Voice cast
 Mickey Mouse: Walt Disney
 Donald Duck: Clarence Nash
 Goofy: Pinto Colvig
 Pete: Pinto Colvig
 Clarabelle Cow: unknown
 Clara Cluck: Florence Gill

Home media
The short was released on December 4, 2001 on Walt Disney Treasures: Mickey Mouse in Living Color.

See also
 Mickey Mouse (film series)

References

Mickey Mouse short films
1930s color films
1930s Disney animated short films
Donald Duck short films
1937 animated films
1937 films
Films directed by Pinto Colvig
Films produced by Walt Disney
Films about entertainers
Films scored by Oliver Wallace
1930s American films